Anna Brown may refer to:

 Anna J. Brown (born 1952), United States District Judge
 Anna Robeson Brown (1873–1941), American writer
 Anna Easter Brown (1879–1957), part of the original nine group of twenty founders in Alpha Kappa Alpha sorority
 Anna V. Brown (1914–1985), African American advocate for the elderly
 Anna Brown (lawyer) (born 1979), Australian lawyer and activist
 Anna Gordon (1747–1810), also known as Mrs Brown, British ballad collector

See also 
 Anne Brown (disambiguation)